The 2019–20 season of the Frauen-Bundesliga was the 30th season of Germany's premier women's football league. It ran from 17 August 2019 to 28 June 2020.

VfL Wolfsburg won their fourth straight and sixth overall title.

Effects of the COVID-19 pandemic
Due to the COVID-19 pandemic in Germany, on 8 March 2020 the Federal Minister of Health, Jens Spahn recommended cancelling events with more than 1,000 people. On 13 March, the DFB announced that a match scheduled for 15 March, was postponed. On 16 March, it was announced that the league will be suspended until 19 April. After a meeting on 31 March, the suspension was extended until 30 April. A decision on the resumption of the competition, similar to the Bundesliga and 2. Bundesliga, was taken at an extraordinary meeting of the DFB-Bundestag on 25 May 2020. On 20 May, it was announced that the league will be continued on 29 May. That was confirmed on 25 May. All matches were played behind closed doors. In addition, five substitutions were permitted for the remaining matches, following a proposal from FIFA and approval by IFAB to lessen the impact of fixture congestion.

Teams

Team changes

Stadiums

League table

Results

Top scorers

Notes

References

External links
Weltfussball.de
DFB.de

2019-20
2019–20 in German women's football leagues
Association football events postponed due to the COVID-19 pandemic